Lluesty Hospital was a community hospital in Holywell, Flintshire, Wales. It was managed by the Betsi Cadwaladr University Health Board.

History
The hospital had its origins in the Holywell Union Workhouse which was designed by John Welch and completed in 1840. A separate infirmary was added in 1913. The facility became the Luesty Public Assistance Institution in 1930 and then joined the National Health Service as Lluesty General Hospital in 1948. After services transferred to Holywell Community Hospital, Lluesty Hospital closed in 2008.

References

Defunct hospitals in Wales
Hospitals established in 1840
Hospital buildings completed in 1840
1840 establishments in Wales
Hospitals in Flintshire